Diospyros daemona is a tree in the family Ebenaceae. The twigs dry greyish. Inflorescences bear up to 10 flowers. The specific epithet  is from the Latin meaning "demon", referring to the poisonous fruit. D. daemona is found in Sumatra, Peninsular Malaysia and Borneo.

References

daemona
Plants described in 1933
Trees of Sumatra
Trees of Peninsular Malaysia
Trees of Borneo